Brummanet al-Mashayekh is a town in northwestern Syria, administratively part of the Tartus Governorate, located northeast of Tartus. Nearby localities include al-Annazeh, Maten al-Sahel and al-Shaykh Badr to the west, Kaff al-Jaa and al-Qadmus to the north and Wadi al-Oyun and Ayn Halaqim to the southeast. According to the Syria Central Bureau of Statistics (CBS), Brummanet al-Mashayekh had a population of 3,666 in the 2004 census.

References

Populated places in Al-Shaykh Badr District
Towns in Syria